The Indonesia men's national volleyball team represents Indonesia in international volleyball competitions and friendly matches.

Competition history

Asian Championship
 Champions   Runners up   Third place   Fourth place

Asian Games
 Champions   Runners up   Third place   Fourth place

Asian Cup
 Champions   Runners up   Third place   Fourth place

Southeast Asian Games
 Champions   Runners up   Third place   Fourth place

Current roster
The following is the Indonesian roster in the 2021 Southeast Asian Games.

Head coach:  Jiang Jie

References

External links
 https://asianvolleyball.net/new/wp-content/uploads/2019/09/ASM-2019-DailyBulletin-01_R2.pdf
 https://www.fivb.com/en/volleyball/rankings/seniorworldrankingmen

National sports teams of Indonesia
National men's volleyball teams
Volleyball in Indonesia
Men's sport in Indonesia